Merrem Peak is a prominent peak of  that is the secondary summit of and is located  west of Berlin Crater on the Mount Berlin massif, in Marie Byrd Land, Antarctica. The peak was discovered and charted by the Pacific Coast Survey Party, led by Leonard Berlin, of the U.S. Antarctic Service in December 1940. It was subsequently mapped by the United States Geological Survey from surveys and U.S. Navy air photos, 1959–66, and was named by the Advisory Committee on Antarctic Names for ionospheric physicist Frank H. Merrem, Jr., Scientific Leader at South Pole Station in 1970.

References

Mountains of Marie Byrd Land
Flood Range